is a 2006 Japanese zombie comedy directed by 
Naoyuki Tomomatsu, written by Naoyuki Tomomatsu and Masami Teranishi, and starring Miyû Watase, Mihiro, Kenji Arai, Yû Machimura, Masayuki Hase, and Norman England.  Mihiro plays a spoiled pop singer who barricades herself in a hotel with several soldiers during a zombie outbreak.

Plot 
On a routine training exercise, soldiers from the Japan Self-Defense Forces encounter a UFO that releases strange radiation on a town.  When the inhabitants turn into zombies, the soldiers and several survivors, including a spoiled pop singer, barricade themselves in a hotel and attempt to survive the assault.

Cast 
 Miyû Watase as Yuri Aso
 Mihiro as Hitomi
 Kenji Arai as Captain
 Yû Machimura 
 Masayuki Hase
 Norman England
 Jun Yamasaki as Hayakawa

Release 
Zombie Self-Defense Force premiered at Dead by Dawn in Edinburgh on April 23, 2006.  It was released on DVD in Japan on April 25, 2006.  ADV Films released it in the United States on October 13, 2009.

Reception 
Rodney Perkins of Twitch Film called it an uneven splatter film made in the style of Evil Dead II and Braindead.  Bill Gibron of DVD Talk rated it 3.5/5 stars and called it "a bucket full of bile topped off with a crazy comedic take on cannibalism" that is "meant to be stupid and weird and eccentric".  David Johnson of DVD Verdict wrote that although it equals Braindead in gore, it is not as well-executed.  Writing in The Zombie Movie Encyclopedia, academic Peter Dendle called it "a series of cheap homages and shock scenes delivered with underfunded cartoon aesthetics."

References

External links 
 

2006 films
2006 horror films
Japanese comedy horror films
Japanese independent films
Zombie comedy films
Japanese splatter films
Japanese zombie films
2000s Japanese films